Common School No. 10 is a historic one-room school building located in Accord in Ulster County, New York. It is a 1-story, two-by-three-bay, frame building on a fieldstone foundation built about 1870. It is topped by a gable roof with an open belfry. It operated as a school until 1955.  Also on the property is a privy, shed, and well with hand pump.

It was listed on the National Register of Historic Places in 1988.

Now known as Palentown School House Museum, the school is open twice a year and by appointment.

References

External links
  Palentown School House Museum information - Accord-Kerhonkson On-Line

School buildings on the National Register of Historic Places in New York (state)
School buildings completed in 1870
One-room schoolhouses in New York (state)
Schoolhouses in the United States
Museums in Ulster County, New York
Education museums in the United States
National Register of Historic Places in Ulster County, New York